Hanford High School is a public high school located on the northern edge of Richland, Washington. It is part of the Richland School District. The school's mascot is the Falcon, and its school colors are purple and gold.

The high school, built in 1972, was originally part of a K-12 complex, which included an elementary and junior high (later a middle school). The elementary school was closed in the mid-1980s due to school district budget cuts, and the middle school was closed in 2005 when Enterprise Middle School was opened in West Richland in the same year. The latest remodel/rebuild was completed in 2007.

Notable alumni 
 Nate Mendel (1987), bassist for Foo Fighters
 Aaron Neary (2011), NFL player
 Jason Repko (1999) MLB player for the Los Angeles Dodgers
 Rachel Willis-Sørensen (2002), opera singer

References

External links
 Official Website
 Official Website of Richland School District
 OSPI school report card, 2012-13
 Hanford High School video news magazine The Falcon Report

High schools in Benton County, Washington
Tri-Cities, Washington
Educational institutions established in 1972
Public high schools in Washington (state)
1972 establishments in Washington (state)